NCHD may refer to:

 National Commission for Human Development
 Non-consultant hospital doctor